The Interpreter (Chinese: 亲爱的翻译官) is a 2016 Chinese television series starring Yang Mi and Huang Xuan, based on the novel Translator (翻译官) by Miao Juan. It aired on Hunan TV from 24 May to 19 June 2016. The series was the highest rated drama of the year, with an average national viewership rating of 2.63%.

Synopsis
Qiao Fei, a university student majoring in French studies, has aspired to become a translator since she was young. Raised by a single mother suffering from a serious illness, she has to support herself working as a waitress. One night she gets into a trouble with a guest, and the two of them are taken to the police station. The guest happens to be Cheng Jiayang, a young but already famous professional French translator. The next day, she finds out that Jia Yang is actually her examiner at the prestigious Institute of Advanced Translation where she dreams of getting a job. Although they start their relationship on the wrong foot, Qiao Fei earns Jiayang's praise when she successfully overcomes his tests and the two start to develop feelings for each other. When everything seems to be going smoothly, problems start to arise one after another. Jiayang's mother strongly opposes their relationship and the reappearance of Gao Jiaming, Qiao Fei's ex-boyfriend, causes additional misunderstandings between Qiao Fei and Jiayang. Mounting problems eventually lead to their separation. Only after overcoming their respective life challenges they meet again and rekindle their love.

Cast
Yang Mi as Qiao Fei
Huang Xuan as Cheng Jiayang
Gao Weiguang as Gao Jiaming
Zhou Qiqi as Wen Xiaohua
Li Xirui as Wu Jiayi
Zhang Yunlong as Wang Xudong
Wang Renjun as Zhou Nan
Li Dongheng as Li Lei
Yi Yanting as Yang Yan
Li Yunao as Wu Ming
Zhang Mingming as Ao Tian
Jiang Xifan as He Zhe
Yang Xueying as Wen Jing

Soundtrack

Reception
The series is a commercial hit in China. Its premiere achieved a national viewer rating share of 6.87%, and topped 2016's overall market share for the first half of the year. Viewership ratings also reached as high as 2%, making it the highest rated drama of 2016. The topic "Dear Translator" (亲爱的翻译官) attracted over a billion readers within five days. On the online video platforms Mango TV (芒果TV) and LeTV (乐视电视), the series has received more than 100 million views. On the Asian TV drama platform Viki, the series was rated 9.3 out of 10.

The series was praised by Martin Dahinden, Swiss ambassador to China. The series was coincidentally filmed during the 65th anniversary of the establishment of China–Switzerland relations, and was sponsored by the Switzerland Tourism Board.

However, the series also received criticism. Loyal fans stated that the television series did not stay true to the original novel. Professional interpreters have also taken against it, slamming it for inaccuracies and for portraying the profession misleadingly.

There is a sequel titled Negotiator that has cast Yang Mi and Huang Zitao as leads. The sequel has a different storyline.

Ratings 

 Highest ratings are marked in red, lowest ratings are marked in blue

Awards and nominations

Spin-off
A spin-off is currently in production, titled The Broker, also based on Miao Juan's novel.

References

Chinese romance television series
Television shows based on Chinese novels
2016 Chinese television series debuts
Hunan Television dramas
2016 Chinese television series endings
Television series by Jay Walk Studio
Television series by Croton Media
Television series by LeEco